Premji: Rise of a Warrior  is a new era Gujarati film directed by Vijaygiri Bava & produced by Twinkle Vijaygiri. It also stars the Hindi cinema actor, Abhimanyu Singh.

The film is about a boy named Premji (played by Mehul Solanki) who hails from a  Kutchi village. He comes to Ahmedabad with a tragic past and he constantly struggles to know who he really is. In this journey, his soul mate, Pavan (played by Aarohi Patel), his mother (Happy Bhavsar) and his best friends Mukesh (Maulik Nayak), Chitra (Namrata Pathak) and Roy (Malhar Pandya) supports him and joins his fight against the evil.

The film was released on 10 July 2015 in Gujarat and received much critical acclaim, especially the bold storyline, direction and performances. On 31 March 2017, the re-edited version of the film got released for the first time in Mumbai and re-released in Gujarat.

Premji : Rise of a Warrior received ten Gujarat State Awards for 2015, including Best Film, Best Director- Vijaygiri bava, Best Actor- Mehul Solanki, Best Story-Screenplay.

Cast
 Abhimanyu Singh as Meghji (Premji's father)
 Happy Bhavsar as Kuwar (Premji's mother)
 Mehul Solanki as Premji
 Aarohi Patel as Pavan 
 Malhar Pandya as Roy
 Namrata Pathak as Chitra
 Maulik Nayak as Mukesh
 Vishal Vaishya as Raghnath Malan
 Thasvi Venkat as Dance performer in Haay haay history song

Production

Development
After directing various short films including the short film Amdavadi Mijaj, Director Vijaygiri is now debuting with Premji – Rise of A Warrior. The concept of a boy who is struggling with himself for his own identity clicked in the director's mind long time ago and he gradually developed the story. Dialogues of the film are written by Gireesh Parmar and Vijaygiri. The cast includes veteran Gujarati theater artists like Happy Bhavsar, Maulik Nayak, Mehul Solanki, Namrata Pathak and Vishal Vaishya along with hindi cinema actor Abhimanyu Singh.

Filming
The film is shot in the locations of Ahmedabad, Diu & Kutch. It was shot at more than 20 locations in 25 days. Talking about filming the locations, VijayGiri said, "We have tried to cover the college life of Ahmedabad but the emphasis was given more to the Kutch locations as per the script's requirement. Also, we have tried to capture Diu the way you might have never seen before."

Music for the film is composed by Kedar Upadhyay–Bhargav Purohit. The duo is well known for composing music in various stage plays. Director Vijaygiri says, "Premji's music is completely theme based music. As the story will progress, you will be able to find lots of variation in music like Kutch folk song, ritual song etc."

See also
List of Gujarati films of 2015

References
Mehul Solanki Interview

External links

 
 Premji – Rise of A Warrior on Facebook

2015 films
Indian drama films
Films shot in India
Films set in Ahmedabad
Films shot in Ahmedabad
Films shot in Gujarat
2010s Gujarati-language films